Eugeniusz Kijewski (born 25 April 1955) is a Polish former basketball player. He competed in the men's tournament at the 1980 Summer Olympics.

References

1955 births
Living people
Polish men's basketball players
Olympic basketball players of Poland
Basketball players at the 1980 Summer Olympics
Sportspeople from Poznań
Lech Poznań (basketball) players
Arka Gdynia basketball coaches